was the 73rd emperor of Japan, according to the traditional order of succession.

Horikawa's reign spanned the years from 1087 through 1107.

Biography
Before his ascension to the Chrysanthemum Throne, his personal name (imina) was Taruhito-shinnō (善仁親王).  He was also known as Yoshihito-tennō.

Horikawa was the son of Emperor Shirakawa.  His mother was Fujiwara no Kenshi (藤原賢子), adopted daughter of Fujiwara Morozane (藤原師実). His wet nurse was a different Fujiwara no Kenshi (藤原兼子).

Empress (chūgū): Imperial Princess Tokushi (篤子内親王), Emperor Go-Sanjo’s daughter

Consort (Nyōgo): Fujiwara no Ishi (藤原苡子; 1076-1103), Fujiwara no Sanesue’s daughter
 Imperial Prince Munehito (宗仁親王) later Emperor Toba

Lady-in-waiting (Naishi): Princess Jinshi (仁子女王; d.1126), Prince Yasusuke’s daughter
 Imperial Princess Soshi (悰子内親王, 1099–1162)

Lady-in-waiting (Naishi): Fujiwara Muneko (藤原宗子; d.1129), Fujiwara Takamune’s daughter
 Kangyō (寛暁; 1103–1159)

Lady-in-waiting (Naishi): Fujiwara Tokitsune’s daughter
 Imperial Prince Priest Saiun (最雲法親王; 1105–1162) head priest of Tendai sect

 Mother Unknown
 Imperial Princess Kishi (喜子内親王)
 Imperial Princess Kaishi (懐子内親王)

Events of Horikawa's life
He became Crown Prince and became emperor on the same day that his father abdicated. His reign was overshadowed by the cloistered rule of former emperor Emperor Shirakawa.

 January 3, 1087 (Ōtoku 3, 26th day of the 11th month): In the 14th year of Emperor Shirakawa-tennōs reign (白河天皇十四年), the emperor abdicated; and the succession (‘‘senso’’) was received by his second son.  Shortly thereafter, Emperor Horikawa is said to have acceded to the throne (‘‘sokui’’).

His father's kampaku, Fujiwara Morozane became sesshō (regent), but Shirakawa held actual power as cloistered Emperor.  Horikawa filled his reign with scholarship, poetry, and music.

When his empress-consort (kōgō) died, his son, Imperial Prince Munehito, who had become Crown Prince (and later became Emperor Toba) was taken to be raised by Horikawa's father, the retired Emperor Shirakawa.

 1105 (Chōji 2, 6th month): A red-colored snow fell over a large area in Japan.
 August 9, 1107 (Kajō 2, 19th day of the 7th month): Horikawa died at the age of 29.

Horikawa died at age 29 in Kajō 2, on the 19th day of the 7th month 1107.  He had reigned 20 years—seven years in the nengō Kanji, two years in Kahō, one year in the nengō Eichō, two years in Jōtoku, five years in the  nengō Kōwa, two years in Chōji, and two years in the nengō Kajō.

The actual site of Horikawa's grave is known.  This emperor is traditionally venerated at a memorial Shinto shrine (misasagi) at Kyoto.

The Imperial Household Agency designates this location as Horikawa's mausoleum.  It is formally named Nochi no Yenkyō-ji no misasagi.

Horikawa is buried amongst the "Seven Imperial Tombs" at Ryōan-ji in Kyoto.  The mound which commemorates the Emperor Horikawa today named Kinugasa-yama.  The emperor's burial place would have been quite humble in the period after Horikawa died.  These tombs reached their present state as a result of the 19th century restoration of imperial sepulchers (misasagi) which were ordered by Emperor Meiji.

Emperor Horikawa was succeeded by his son, Munehito, who would take the name Emperor Toba.

Kugyō
Kugyō (公卿) is a collective term for the very few most powerful men attached to the court of the Emperor of Japan in pre-Meiji eras. Even during those years in which the court's actual influence outside the palace walls was minimal, the hierarchic organization persisted.

In general, this elite group included only three to four men at a time.  These were hereditary courtiers whose experience and background would have brought them to the pinnacle of a life's career.  During Horikawa's reign, this apex of the Daijō-kan included: 
 Sesshō, Fujiwara Morozane, 1043–1101.
 Kampaku, Fujiwara Moromichi, 1062–1099.
 Kampaku, Fujiwara Tadazane.
 Daijō-daijin, Fujiwara Morozane.
 Sadaijin
 Udaijin, Fujiwara Tadazane.
 Nadaijin, Fujiwara Moromichi.
 Dainagon, Fujiwara Tadazane.

Eras of Horikawa's reign
The years of Horikawa's reign are more specifically identified by more than one era name or nengō.
 Ōtoku         (1084–1087)
 Kanji   (1087–1094)
 Kahō           (1094–1096)
 Eichō         (1096–1097)
 Jōtoku       (1097–1099)
 Kōwa   (1099–1104)
 Chōji         (1104–1106)
 Kajō           (1106–1108)

Empresses and consorts
 1060–1114 Empress (chūgū): Imperial Princess Princess Tokushi (篤子内親王) – fourth daughter of Emperor Go-Sanjō, and hence his aunt
 1076–1103 Empress (kōgō): Fujiwara no Ishi (藤原苡子)
 ????–1126 Lady-in-waiting: Minamoto ?? (源仁子) – Daughter of Prince ?? (康資王)
 ????–1129 Lady-in-waiting: Fujiwara ?? (藤原宗子), daughter of Fujiwara (藤原隆宗) – later wife of Fujiwara ?? (藤原家保)
 Daughter of Fujiwara ?? (藤原時経)

Ancestry

Notes

References
 Brown, Delmer M. and Ichirō Ishida, eds. (1979).  Gukanshō: The Future and the Past. Berkeley: University of California Press. ;  OCLC 251325323
 Mosher, Gouverneur. (1978). Kyoto: A Contemplative Guide. ;  OCLC 4589403
 Ponsonby-Fane, Richard Arthur Brabazon. (1959).  The Imperial House of Japan. Kyoto: Ponsonby Memorial Society. OCLC 194887
 Titsingh, Isaac. (1834). Nihon Odai Ichiran; ou,  Annales des empereurs du Japon.  Paris: Royal Asiatic Society, Oriental Translation Fund of Great Britain and Ireland.  OCLC 5850691
 Varley, H. Paul. (1980). Jinnō Shōtōki: A Chronicle of Gods and Sovereigns. New York: Columbia University Press. ;  OCLC 59145842

See also
 Emperor of Japan
 List of Emperors of Japan
 Imperial cult
 Emperor Go-Horikawa

Japanese emperors
1079 births
1107 deaths
People of Heian-period Japan
11th-century Japanese monarchs
12th-century Japanese monarchs